Blue World is the fifth Japanese language single of South Korean boy band Super Junior, released on 11 December 2013 by Avex Trax.

Background
It was announced on September 26, 2013, during the event E.L.F-JAPAN FESTIVAL 2013 that Super Junior would be releasing their fifth official Japanese single, "Blue World", in December 2013. The song will be the first original Japanese release by the group. It was later revealed on October 23 the single was set for December 11, containing on the B-Side another song named "Candy". The single was released in three different editions: CD-only, 2CD+DVD and E.L.F JAPAN version.

On November 8, 2013, Avex released a highlight medley of the upcoming single through YouTube with a preview of both songs and revealed the different covers from each edition of the single. This will be the first song of the group involving Heechul after he came back from the military service.

Commercial performance
"Blue World" peaked on the daily Oricon Singles Chart at number two, having sold 46,968 copies. It charted at #2 in the Oricon Weekly Chart with 68,684 copies sold.

Promotion
Super Junior made a collaboration with Tokyo JoyPolis named "Play the Blue World" with 3D technology, full color laser system and illumination stage until January 13, 2014, to promote the single. Super Junior also perform a live version of the song in their Super Show 5 in Kyocera Dome, Osaka in November, 2013.

Track listing

DVD
 "Blue World" music video
 "Blue World" music video making-of

Charts and sales

Oricon

References 

Super Junior songs
Japanese-language songs
2013 singles
SM Entertainment singles
Avex Trax singles
2013 songs